The 38th Pennsylvania House of Representatives District is located in southwestern Pennsylvania and has been represented by Nick Pisciottano since 2020.

District profile
The 38th Pennsylvania House of Representatives District is located in Allegheny County and  includes the following areas:

 Baldwin
 Dravosburg
 Glassport
Pittsburgh (part)
Ward 31
 West Mifflin (part) 
District 01 
District 02 
District 05
District 06 
District 07 
District 08 
District 09 
District 10 
District 11 
District 12 
District 13 
District 14 
District 16 
District 17 
District 18 
District 19 
District 20 
District 21
 Whitehall

Representatives

Recent election results

References

External links
District map from the United States Census Bureau
Pennsylvania House Legislative District Maps from the Pennsylvania Redistricting Commission.  
Population Data for District 38 from the Pennsylvania Redistricting Commission.

Government of Allegheny County, Pennsylvania
38